Cattleya crispa is a species of orchid indigenous to the Tijuca Mountains north of Rio de Janeiro, Brazil, noted for its crisped and ruffled petals and lip. It is the type species for both the subgenus Cattleya subg. Crispae and its section Cattleya sect. Crispae.

Prior to 2000, C. crispa had long been placed in the genus Laelia because it had eight pollinia, instead of the four found in Cattleya labiata, the type species of the genus Cattleya.  In 2000, the "Brazilian Laelias" (including L. crispa) were transferred to the genus Sophronitis.  In 2008, the entire genus Sophronitis was sunk into the genus Cattleya, and S. crispa was given its original name of C. crispa.

References

External links 

Orchids of Brazil listing - mirandaorchids.com (includes pictures of C. crispa and distribution map)

crispa
Endemic orchids of Brazil
Orchids of Rio de Janeiro (state)